Odd Sannes (3 August 1922 – 24 March 1999) was a Norwegian Olympic sport shooter and World Champion.

He became World Champion in 1947. He competed in the 300 m rifle event at the 1948 Summer Olympics in London, placing 15th.

References

1922 births
1999 deaths
Norwegian male sport shooters
ISSF rifle shooters
Olympic shooters of Norway
Shooters at the 1948 Summer Olympics
Sportspeople from Oslo
20th-century Norwegian people